Paul Satterfield Jr. (born August 19, 1960) is an American actor.  He is best known for his roles in a number of television series including General Hospital (as Paul Hornsby), The Bold and the Beautiful (as Dr. Pierce Peterson), and One Life to Live (as Spencer Truman). He has also appeared in films such as Creepshow 2, Arena, and Bruce Almighty.

Career
Satterfield began his credited career as a male model before moving to acting in films and television shows.  In 1987, he had his first significant film appearance in the horror anthology film Creepshow 2, playing the role of Deke in a segment based on a Stephen King's story "The Raft". This is followed by a starring role in Arena in 1989.

In 1991, he had a guest role in the popular teenage drama, Beverly Hills, 90210. That year he also became the first actor to play the role of Paul Hornsby on the ABC soap opera, General Hospital, a part he portrayed until 1994. He then starred alongside Jennifer Lopez in the short-lived television series Hotel Malibu. In 1997, he had recurring roles in Savannah, 7th Heaven, and Pacific Palisades.  After numerous appearances of the big and small screens, Satterfield returned to soap operas portraying Dr. Pierce Peterson on The Bold and the Beautiful from 1998 to 1999 and 2001-2002. He had guest roles on many shows including 7th Heaven, Will & Grace and the American version of the British sitcom, Coupling. He later had a minor role in Jim Carrey's 2003 film, Bruce Almighty.

Satterfield most recently portrayed Dr. Spencer Truman on the ABC soap opera, One Life to Live, a role he originated in June 2005. His character was killed off on January 26, 2007, but Satterfield continued to make numerous appearances via flashbacks and dreams until August 2007.  In 2011, he appeared in the second season of The Bay.

Satterfield has since pursued a career in education after finishing a Masters Degree in education at Drury University in 2013.

Personal life
Satterfield was born in Nashville, Tennessee. He is the son of Paul Satterfield, a Nashville firefighter who was killed in the line of duty, and singer songwriter Priscilla Coolidge. His half-brother Evan Satterfield is a Firefighter-Paramedic on the Nashville Fire Department. 
He is also the nephew of the singer Rita Coolidge. His stepfather was Booker T. Jones of Booker T and the MGs fame.

Satterfield was often mistaken for Christopher Reeve because of their striking resemblance.  He reminisced about the confusion from the press and public in a 2005 issue of ABC Soaps In Depth magazine, "As soon as I would show up, I would get mobbed by the press and everybody thinking I was him because he was supposed to be there." The case of mistaken identity would continue throughout the night, where Satterfield would frequently have to tell the confused onlookers, "I'm sorry, I'm sorry, I think the person you want to talk to is over there," only to overhear people later refer to him as "Chris Reeve's little brother." Satterfield did meet Reeve a few times, and the two would joke about their eerie physical similarities. "It was almost like when we would shake hands, it was like shaking my own hand. We had the same height - 6'4", the same build - you know, it was just unbelievable."

Filmography

Film

TV

References

External links

1960 births
American male film actors
American male soap opera actors
American male television actors
Living people
People from Nashville, Tennessee